Elizabeth Rowe (born 1974) is an American flutist, known for being the principal flutist of the Boston Symphony Orchestra and for a gender discrimination lawsuit.

Rowe grew up in Oregon where she started playing the flute as a child. She earned a music degree and has held several titled positions with professional orchestras. In 2004, she won a blind audition against 250 other applicants to become the principal flutist of the Boston Symphony Orchestra.

In 2018, she filed a gender discrimination lawsuit against the Boston Symphony Orchestra alleging she was paid less on account of her gender. The case was settled out of court in February 2019.

Early life and education
Rowe was born in 1974 and grew up in Eugene, Oregon. Her parents were both college professors with an interest in music. She started studying the flute when she was 7 years old. Rowe earned a degree in music from the University of Southern California. She was also a fellow at the Tanglewood Music Center.

Career
In 1998, when Rowe was 23 years old, she was hired as the principal flutist of the Fort Wayne Philharmonic Orchestra. This was followed by positions with the Baltimore Symphony Orchestra and the National Symphony Orchestra in Washington D.C. Rowe also played with the New World Symphony and is on the faculty of the New England Conservatory of Music.

In 2004, at age 29, Rowe won a blind audition against 250 other flute players for the principal flute position with the Boston Symphony Orchestra (BSO), which is one of the "Big Five" famous American orchestras. Her husband also joined the BSO in 2006. As of 2018, Rowe had been a concerto soloist in 28 BSO concerts. She was also frequently used as a spokesperson in their publicity and marketing efforts.

Discrimination lawsuit 

Rowe filed a gender discrimination lawsuit against the Boston Symphony Orchestra in July 2018. Her lawsuit is believed to be the first gender discrimination suit filed under the Massachusetts Equal Pay Act, a law that went into effect in July 2018. The lawsuit prompted public discussion about gender biases in the classical music industry.

The basis of the lawsuit was that Rowe was paid about $64,000 less than the male principal oboist she sat next to. Rowe claimed this was because of her gender, while the BSO claimed oboists were more expensive than flutists due to market forces. Rowe and the BSO entered mediation in December 2018, and the lawsuit was settled out of court for an undisclosed amount in February 2019.

References

External links
 Personal website
 Boston Symphony Orchestra bio
 Official page at the New England Conservatory of Music website
 Interview with Katie Couric

Feminist musicians
American flautists
Living people
1974 births
20th-century American women musicians
Women flautists
Musicians from Eugene, Oregon
University of Southern California alumni
20th-century classical musicians
21st-century American women musicians
21st-century classical musicians
20th-century American musicians
21st-century American musicians
New England Conservatory faculty
Classical musicians from Oregon
American women academics
20th-century flautists
21st-century flautists